Sublimation or sublimate may refer to:

 Sublimation (album), by Canvas Solaris, 2004
 Sublimation (phase transition), directly from the solid to the gas phase
 Sublimation (psychology), a mature type of defense mechanism
 Sublimate of mercury, or Mercury(II) chloride
 Volcanic sublimate, a product of deposition from vapors around volcanic vents

See also

 Sublime (disambiguation)
 Sublimity (disambiguation)
 Dye-sublimation printer, a type of computer printer